November Christmas is a 2010 American made-for-television Christmas drama film based on a short story written by Greg Coppa. The film depicts a young couple struggling with the illness of their daughter, and the effect their family had on the small, rural community they have become a part of. The film was shot in Nova Scotia. It was presented through Hallmark Hall of Fame, and premiered on CBS on November 28, 2010.

Plot
A small Rhode Island community comes together to create special holiday (Halloween, Thanksgiving Day, and Christmas) moments several weeks early for Vanessa Marks, an 8-year-old girl with a life-threatening illness.

At the beginning of the film, Vanessa's father Tom (John Corbett) gives her a snow globe and inside that globe is another little girl holding a snow globe.  Her mother Beth (Sarah Paulson) tells Vanessa that she has to shake the globe to make it snow.  Vanessa is fascinated with the snow, having never seen it before, and wishes that she could see it for Christmas.  Her father, hearing this, becomes concerned that Vanessa may not live to see December.

After Tom quietly asks Jess Sanford, a neighboring farmer (Sam Elliott) about buying pumpkins - and later Christmas trees - the farmer figures out that the father is trying to speed up the holidays so that Vanessa will have the best Christmas before she dies.  Jess, while searching for pumpkins to surprise the Marks family, heals an old friendship that he'd lost when his own son had passed away years ago, and is rewarded with an invitation to be his old friend's best man at the friend's upcoming wedding. Together, the two men sneak a truckload of pumpkins onto the family's front porch, much to the surprise of the daughter who decides she wants to have a Halloween party.  The mother tries to explain that it's too early, but the father agrees to the party and Vanessa (and her younger brother) begin to plan their Halloween costumes.

As a show of appreciation, Tom goes to the Sanford home and invites him and his wife to the party. Jess goes to town and mentions it to Tammy, a young waitress (Elizabeth McLaughlin) at the local restaurant whom Vanessa had befriended. Later, the farmer gives the father a box of Halloween decorations to help decorate the family's house, and on the night of the party the waitress arrives with all the town's children to help celebrate. Vanessa (who was prohibited from going to school and meeting other children because of her illness) is overjoyed at having so many playmates and friends. Jess, his wife, and his friend and his new wife follow carrying trays of food.  Tammy tries her skills as a storyteller and tells a ghost story that makes the children scream and laugh.

Together, Jess, his old friend, and Tammy help the family celebrate Halloween - and each holiday thereafter - a month early, and in doing so unite an entire community and teach everyone that what really matters in life is love.

As Vanessa and her family return home one night from a particularly sorrowful hospital visit, they find that the neighbors have decorated their homes and streets with brilliant lights and holiday decorations a full month early.  Jess, his friend, and the neighboring community line the family's driveway to greet Vanessa as she arrives home; her own house covered in beautiful lights.  Everyone is invited inside the home to celebrate with food given by the town's local restaurant, and later, Vanessa runs outside with her snow globe just as an early snow begins to fall, duplicating the little girl inside the globe.

Later, Tammy writes a children's book about Vanessa's life, with pictures that Vanessa had made herself during her illness.  In the final scenes, a young woman (reading Tammy's book to children at the local library) explains that she is Vanessa, who is all grown-up and is now perfectly healthy; revealing that she had survived her illness after that early Christmas.  Afterwards, she goes to the Sanfords' Christmas tree lot where she reunites with her family and Jess himself; to select the town's annual tree.

Cast
 Sam Elliott as Jess Sanford
 Karen Allen as Claire Sanford
 John Corbett as Tom Marks
 Sarah Paulson as Beth Marks
 Max Charles as Gordon Marks
 Emily Alyn Lind as Young Vanessa
 Elizabeth McLaughlin as Tammy
 Tegan Moss as Adult Vanessa
Tyler Burns as Adult Gordon

Sequel
Greg Coppa wrote a short story sequel to November Christmas titled "A Partridge in a Persimmon Tree".

See also
 List of Christmas films

References

External links

2010 television films
2010 films
2010s Christmas drama films
American Christmas drama films
Christmas television films
Films based on short fiction
Films set in Rhode Island
Films shot in Nova Scotia
CBS network films
Films directed by Robert Harmon
Hallmark Hall of Fame episodes
American drama television films
2010s American films